The Porbandar–Delhi Sarai Rohilla Superfast Express is an Superfast train belonging to Western Railway zone that runs between Porbandar and Delhi Sarai Rohilla in India. It is currently being operated with 20937/20938 train numbers on a bi-weekly basis.

Coach composition

The train has standard ICF rakes with max speed of 110 kmph. The train consists of 22 coaches :

 1 AC II Tier
 5 AC III Tier
 9 Sleeper coaches
 1 Pantry car
 4 General Unreserved
 2 Seating cum Luggage Rake

Service

19263/Porbandar–Delhi Sarai Rohilla Superfast Express has an average speed of 58 km/hr and covers 1373 km in 23 hrs 50 mins.

19264/Delhi Sarai Rohilla–Porbandar Superfast Express has an average speed of 55 km/hr and covers 1373 km in 24 hrs 50 mins.

Route and halts 

The important halts of the train are:

 
 
 
 
  (Ahmedabad)

Schedule

Rake sharing 

The train shares its rake with 12905/12906 Shalimar–Porbandar Superfast Express, 19269/19270 Porbandar–Muzaffarpur Express and 19201/19202 Secunderabad–Porbandar Weekly Express.

Traction

Both trains are hauled by a Vatva Loco Shed-based WDM-3A diesel locomotive from Muzaffarpur to Porbandar and vice versa.

See also 

 Porbandar railway station
 Delhi Sarai Rohilla railway station
 Secunderabad–Porbandar Weekly Express
 Porbandar–Muzaffarpur Express
 Shalimar–Porbandar Superfast Express

References

External links 

 20937/Porbandar–Delhi Sarai Rohilla Superfast Express
 20938/Delhi Sarai Rohilla–Porbandar Superfast Express

Transport in Delhi
Transport in Porbandar
Express trains in India
Rail transport in Delhi
Rail transport in Haryana
Rail transport in Rajasthan
Rail transport in Gujarat